The 2011 Northern Mystics season saw Northern Mystics compete in the 2011 ANZ Championship. With a team coached by Debbie Fuller and captained by Temepara George, Mystics finished the regular season fourth behind Queensland Firebirds, Waikato Bay of Plenty Magic and New South Wales Swifts. During the regular season, Mystics claimed their first win in Australia, with a 56–54 win over West Coast Fever in Round 9. Mystics defeated Swifts in the minor semi-final and Magic in the preliminary final before losing to Firebirds in the grand final. Mystics finished the season second overall.

Players

Player movements

Roster

Milestones
 Temepara George played her 50th ANZ Championship/Mystics match in Round 10 against New South Wales Swifts.
 Cathrine Latu played her 50th ANZ Championship/Mystics match in Round 11 against Canterbury Tactix.

Pre-season
Waikato Bay of Plenty Magic and Northern Mystics played a five-quarter match  during pre-season.

Regular season

Fixtures and results
Round 1

Round 2

Round 3

Round 4

Round 5

Round 6

Round 7

Round 8

Round 9

Round 10 

Round 11

Round 12

Notes
  The Round 3 match between Canterbury Tactix and Northern Mystics was due to be played on 27 February. However it was postponed due to the 2011 Christchurch earthquake. The match was rescheduled for 7 April.

Standings

Finals

Minor semifinal

Preliminary final

Grand final

Statistics

Award winners

ANZ Championship awards

All Star Team

References

2011
2011 ANZ Championship season
2011 in New Zealand netball